Victor Steam was an American automobile company started in 1899. They made steam powered vehicles.

It had a 4 hp vertical 2-cylinder engine and single chain drive. In 1900 the Victor bicycle business was sold to the Stevens Arms & Tool Co., and for a few months Overman leased the top floor of the building to assemble Victor cars.

References

Defunct motor vehicle manufacturers of the United States
Steam cars
Steam road vehicle manufacturers
1890s cars
1900s cars
American companies established in 1899
Vehicle manufacturing companies established in 1899
Stevens Arms